Vaginal seeding, also known as microbirthing, is a procedure whereby vaginal fluids (and hence vaginal microbes) are applied to a new-born child delivered by caesarean section. The idea of vaginal seeding was explored in 2015 after Maria Gloria Dominguez-Bello discovered that birth by caesarean section significantly altered the newborn child's microbiome compared to that of natural birth. The purpose of the technique is to recreate the natural transfer of bacteria that the baby gets during a vaginal birth. It involves placing swabs in the mother's vagina, and then wiping them onto the baby's face, mouth, eyes and skin. Due to the long-drawn nature of studying the impact of vaginal seeding, there are a limited number of studies available that support or refute its use. The evidence suggests that applying microbes from the mother's vaginal canal to the baby after cesarean section may aid in the partial restoration of the infant’s natural gut microbiome with an increased likelihood of pathogenic infection to the child via vertical transmission.

History 
Theodor Rosebury began his study of the human microbiota in 1928. More than thirty years later, he published Microorganisms Indigenous to Man. In this book, he discussed the importance of microbial colonization after birth and its role in forming the infant microbiome. In 2015, Rosebery's perspective of microbial colonization after birth was further elucidated by a group of researchers in the United States. Studies performed by Maria Gloria Dominguez-Bello and her team indicated that the microbiome of a child born by cesarean section was significantly different from that of a child delivered by natural birth.

Purpose 
In the early life of animals, as well as humans, the development of the immune system and metabolism is influenced by the infant’s microbiota, and alteration, dysbiosis, in the microbiota can either prevent or cause disease. The method of birth, whether vaginal or caesarean section, determines the exposure and colonization of the infant’s gut microbiota. The purpose behind the practice of vaginal seeding or micro birthing is that it allows an infant delivered via caesarean section to come in contact with microbes from the birth canal. Infants delivered vaginally are exposed to beneficial microorganisms known as microbiota when they travel down the birth canal. Infants are exposed to critical bacteria via vaginal birth, such as Lactobacillus, Prevotella, Bacteroides, Escherichia/Shigella, and Bifidobacterium. Bifidobacterium is a key bacteria in the nourishment of the infants, development of immunity, and maturation of the intestinal tissue. The expectation is that this may boost their gut bacteria and lessen the danger of health issues normally associated with caesarian infants. It contributes to the seeding of the infant's  gut.

The baby is exposed to the mother's vaginal microbes that wash over the child in the birth canal, which coves the skin, and enters the baby's eyes, ears, nose, and mouth. These microbes often travel down into the gut after being swallowed. It is said that these microbes are important in the postnatal development of the immune system of the baby.

In the event that a C-section is done before labour starts or before a woman's water breaks, the infant won't come into contact with maternal vaginal fluid or bacteria. Instead, they come in contact with skin microbes, such as Staphylococcus, Streptococcus, Veillonella, and Corynebacterium. a very different set of species. These differences, in turn, have been associated with increased risks of asthma, allergies, obesity, and immune deficiencies. Thus, these differences appear more often in infants after a caesarean delivery than after a vaginal delivery, according to certain epidemiological data.

Evidence 
Evidence suggests that cesarean delivery can increase the risk for inflammatory and metabolic diseases in infants. It is unclear whether vaginal seeding has long-term benefits or whether it is safe. In 2016 a small study of 18 infants was published in the Journal Nature Medicine to look into the benefits of vaginal seeding. The microbiome of the four cesarean delivered infants receiving the microbial transfer was found to have a similar microbiome to the seven vaginally delivered infants. The results of the study suggest that vaginal seeding partially restores the neonatal microbiome. However, the study authors acknowledged that the long-term consequences of vaginal seeding remain unclear due to limited data.

In 2017, a subsequent study was published which found that there wasn't a big difference, after six weeks, between the microbes of infants born vaginally versus those who delivered by C-section without receiving vaginal seeding.  Certain scholars have pointed out that a baby's exposure to bacteria begins even before birth and more research is required on this matter.

Risks 
The scientific evidence regarding the short and long-term benefits of vaginal seeding, as well as the risks involved, is limited. Due to the widespread clinical advice given against performing vaginal seeding, there is insufficient support for the procedure. Following a nonclinical vaginal seeding procedure, there was a reported case of localized neonatal herpes simplex virus (HSV) infection, however, it cannot be supported that the infection was due to the procedure or another factor.

Infants delivered by C-section are at a lower danger of exchange of some potentially harmful microbes and infections from the birth canal. Although it remains unknown, vaginal seeding procedures may take these harmful microorganisms, including undetected sexually transmitted infections (STIs) and unintentionally transfer them to the infant. This could potentially cause an infection. It has been proposed that implementing a screening protocol for potential vaginal pathogens may be beneficial when considering vaginal seeding.

An editorial written in the British Medical Journal is advising practitioners and parents to not perform vaginal seeding as there is not enough evidence that it is beneficial for infants and could potentially put babies' health at risk.

The American College of Obstetricians and Gynecologists (ACOG) also does not encourage or recommend vaginal seeding due to lack of evidence.

See also 

 Hygiene hypothesis
 Outline of obstetrics - the care of all women's reproductive tracts and their children during pregnancy, childbirth and the postnatal period

References 

Childbirth
Caesarean sections